The Taipei Metro Daan Park station is a metro station on the Red Line located beneath Xinyi Rd, Sec. 3 between Xinsheng South Rd. and Jianguo South Rd. in Da'an District, Taipei, Taiwan. It is located at the northern end of the Daan Forest Park for which it is named after. The station was opened on 24 November 2013.

Station overview

The two-level, underground station with an island platform. It has a naturally-lit hall and sunken garden. The naturally-lit hall has two light towers and a light hallway. The sunken garden connects to the hall and has a ring-shaped corridor, pond, cascade and a circular plaza. The station also has an underground parking lot.

An earlier draft for the station's design did not include the waterfall and sunken, ring-shaped corridor design, though it still maintained the sunken plaza within the station lobby.

Construction
It has six entrances, three elevators for the disabled and two vent shafts. One of the entrances is integrated into a joint development building. The 34-story building is incorporated into exit D and was completed in December 2010. Due to station construction, old banyan trees originally planted on the sidewalk along Xinyi Road were replanted elsewhere within the park.

Design
The design theme for the station is "Forest Revolution: the City and Park Conversing".

Station layout

First and Last Train Timing 
The first and last train timing at Daan Park station  is as follows:

Around the station
 Daan Forest Park
 Taipei Grand Mosque

References

Railway stations opened in 2013
Tamsui–Xinyi line stations